Walter Fox McKeithen (September 8, 1946 – July 16, 2005) served five terms as Secretary of State of Louisiana between 1988 and 2005. He is best known for merging the state's election divisions into one department and for the promotion of historical preservation.

Early life and education
McKeithen was born in rural Columbia, Louisiana to John Julian McKeithen and the former Marjorie Howell Funderburk. According to his tombstone, he was named for two World War II heroes, Walter Bennett and Elmer Fox. He graduated as class president in 1964 from Caldwell Parish High School, the same month in which his father was inaugurated as governor of Louisiana. One of his classmates was future associate justice of the Louisiana Supreme Court, Chet D. Traylor. McKeithen attended Louisiana Tech University in Ruston in Lincoln Parish to obtain a bachelor's degree in history and social studies.

After graduating from Louisiana Tech, McKeithen returned to Caldwell Parish High School, located off U.S. Route 165, as a civics teacher and coach. He also established three businesses in Caldwell Parish.

Democrat for secretary of state, 1987

Republican for Secretary of State, 1991

In the summer of 1989, McKeithen switched to the Republican Party, whose chairman, William "Billy" Nungesser, had courted him for a possible 1990 campaign for the United States Senate against the Democrat J. Bennett Johnston, Jr. Upon making the party switch, the GOP helped McKeithen pay off $400,000 in campaign debts.

In subsequent elections, McKeithen was often endorsed by Democrats and worked well with members from both parties. His folksy manner meant that he was generally popular with voters despite adopting such unpopular positions as raising the pay of elected state officials.

Death

McKeithen resigned as secretary of state on July 15, 2005, and died just a few hours later. He left his state pension to his widow, Yvonne Y. McKeithen.

Legacy
In 2006, McKeithen was inducted posthumously into the Louisiana Political Museum and Hall of Fame in Winnfield, an honor that his father had procured in 1993, having been among the first thirteen honorees.

References

Links
 Shreveport Times report on death July 16, 2005 
 Biography as Secretary of State

External links

1946 births
2005 deaths
Secretaries of State of Louisiana
Members of the Louisiana House of Representatives
Louisiana Democrats
Louisiana Republicans
Historical preservationists
20th-century American businesspeople
Methodists from Louisiana
Louisiana Tech University alumni
People from Columbia, Louisiana
Politicians from Baton Rouge, Louisiana
Accidental deaths from falls
Accidental deaths in Louisiana
20th-century American politicians
Burials in Louisiana
20th-century American educators
Schoolteachers from Louisiana